Liiva Cemetery is a cemetery near Ülemiste Lake, Tallinn, Estonia. Its area is 65 ha.

The cemetery was opened in 1935. The cemetery's chapel was also opened in 1935. The chapel was designed by Herbert Johanson. The first burial was politician Hans Martinson.

Burials
 Dajan Ahmet
 Eduard Alver
 Rein Aun
 Marie Heiberg
 Herbert Johanson
 Kert Kesküla
 Arnold Meri
 Aleksander Promet
 Marie Reisik
 Evald Tipner
 Aarne Üksküla

References

External links
 

Cemeteries in Tallinn
Burials at Liiva Cemetery